Angela Theodora Billingham, Baroness Billingham  (born 31 July 1939) is a British Labour politician.

Early life
Born Angela Theodora Case in Liverpool, she was educated at Aylesbury Grammar School, the Institute of Education and the Department of Education, Oxford University. She became a teacher, working in education for thirty five years until 1995.

Political career
Baroness Billingham was a councillor for many years. From 1970 until 1974, she served on Banbury Borough Council, then from 1974 to 1984 on Cherwell District Council. She was Mayor of Banbury in 1976. She was an Oxfordshire county councillor 1993–94. She stood for Parliament in 1992 for Banbury, without success.

Billingham was elected to the European Parliament for Northamptonshire and Blaby in 1994. In 1999 she unsuccessfully stood for the European Parliament in the new East Midlands Region. She was made a life peer as Baroness Billingham, of Banbury in the County of Oxfordshire on 2 May 2000 and sits on the Labour benches.

Interests
She has promoted sports for people with disabilities and is a regular on Sky News where she previews the following morning's newspapers. Angela also campaigns for reform of the current Daylight Saving system, arguing that lighter evenings could end the national scourge of childhood obesity by allowing children to do an extra hour of physical activity a day. She also cites economic, environmental and safety concerns as important reasons for reform of the current system. She is also a keen tennis player, and is Chair/Captain of the Commons and Lords Tennis Club and the Chair of the All-Party Parliamentary Tennis Group.

Personal life
She married Peter Billingham in 1962 and they had two daughters, Zoë and Caroline. Peter died in 1992. Zoë is married to Dennis Skinner, son of Dennis Skinner, the long-serving former Labour MP for Bolsover.

Parliamentary expenses
Subsistence Allowances are designed to help peers who live in the country to attend late-night votes and debates in Parliament, Billingham, who has a flat in Hampstead and a country house in Suffolk claimed £26,983 in 2006–07 in overnight allowances, prompting calls for an inquiry.

References

External links
 Baroness Billingham page on theyworkforyou.com

1939 births
Living people
Alumni of the UCL Institute of Education
Life peeresses created by Elizabeth II
Labour Party (UK) life peers
Mayors of places in Oxfordshire
20th-century women MEPs for England
Labour Party (UK) MEPs
MEPs for England 1994–1999
People educated at Aylesbury Grammar School
Women mayors of places in England